Martin Jacoby (12 April 1842, Altona – 24 December 1907, London) was a German entomologist who specialised in Coleoptera, especially Chrysomelidae (formerly known as Phytophaga). He was also a musician who played in the orchestra of the Royal Italian Opera in London, and later became a violin tutor.

Selected works

1880–1892. Insecta. Coleoptera. Phytophaga (part). Volume VI, Part 1 (Supp.) of Biologia Centrali-Americana
1885–1894 Insecta. Coleoptera. Phytophaga (part). Volume VI, Part 2 of Biologia Centrali-Americana
1899. Descriptions of the new species of phytophagous Coleoptera obtained by Dr. Dohrn in Sumatra.Stettiner Entomologische Zeitung 60: 259–313, 1 pl.
1903. Coleoptera Phytophaga Fam. Sagridae.in: P. Wytsman (ed.), Genera Insectorum. Fascicule 14A. P. Wytsman, Brussels, pp. 1–11 1 pl.
1904. Coleoptera Phytophaga Fam. Sagridae. in: P. Wytsman (ed.), Genera Insectorum. Fascicule 14B. P. Wytsman, Brussels, pp. 13–14.
1904. with H. Clavareau Coleoptera Phytophaga Fam. Donacidae. in: P. Wytsman (ed.), Genera Insectorum. Fascicule 21. P. Wytsman, Brussels, 15 pp., 1 pl.
1904. with H. Clavareau Coleoptera Phytophaga Fam. Crioceridae. in: P. Wytsman (ed.), Genera Insectorum. Fascicule 23. P. Wytsman, Brussels, 40 pp., 1 pl.
1905. with H. Clavareau . Coleoptera Phytophaga Fam. Megascelidae. in: P. Wytsman (ed.), Genera Insectorum. Fascicule 32. P. Wytsman, Brussels, 6 pp., 1 pl.
1905. with H. Clavareau.  Coleoptera Phytophaga Fam. Megalopidae. in: P. Wytsman (ed.), Genera Insectorum. Fascicule 33. P. Wytsman, Brussels, 20 pp., 2 pls.
1906. with H. Clavareau.  Coleoptera Phytophaga Fam. Chrysomelidae Subfam. Clytrinae. in: P. Wytsman (ed.), Genera Insectorum. Fascicule 49. P. Wytsman, Brussels, 87 pp., 5 pls.
1908. (posthumous) Coleoptera. Chrysomelidae. Volume 1. The Fauna of British India, Including Ceylon and Burma.

Collection
Jacoby's collection is divided between the Museum of Comparative Zoology, Harvard University and the Natural History Museum, London.

References

  [photo of Martin Jacoby also visible on previous page]
Horn, Walther (H. R.) 1908: Dt. ent. Z. 1908 427–428
Jacobson, G. 1909: [Jacoby, M.] List of papers of the late Martin Jacoby. Entomologist 42 10–16, 32–35
Musgrave, A. 1932: Bibliography of Australian Entomology 1775–1930.Sydney

External links
Scans of works on Chrysomelidae by Jacoby (Fauna British India) Internet Archive

German entomologists
Coleopterists
1842 births
1907 deaths
19th-century German male musicians